Nervous Night is a 1986 film starring American rock band The Hooters and directed by John Charles Jopson.

Background
As a follow-up to The Hooters' 1985 Columbia Records debut album Nervous Night, a film of the same title was produced by Bell One Productions. Nervous Night was shot on 35mm film and intercuts two separate elements: a concert filmed at the Tower Theater in Philadelphia, and a series of short films, each one starring a different band member.

The highly stylized short films were shot on days off while the band toured the Pacific Northwest and includes scenes filmed in San Francisco, Portland, and Seattle. The concert includes performances of their hit songs "All You Zombies," "Time After Time" (a No. 1 song for Cyndi Lauper that was co-written by band member Rob Hyman), "And We Danced" and "Day By Day."

Track listing

Notes
 Tracks 2 to 8 are recorded live in concert at the Tower Theater in Philadelphia. Track 1 and 9 are videos

Awards
At Billboard'''s 8th Annual Video Music Conference on November 22, 1986, The Hooters received two awards: For Nervous Night: Best Longform Program and Best Concert Performance'' for the "Where Do the Children Go" video taken from the film.

Personnel
The Hooters
Eric Bazilian - lead vocals, guitar, mandolin
Rob Hyman - lead vocals, keyboards, accordion
David Uosikkinen - drums
John Lilley - guitar
Andy King - bass guitar, vocals

External links 
 

1986 films
Documentary films about rock music and musicians
1980s English-language films
Films directed by John Jopson